State Route 308 (SR 308) is a secondary state route located in northern Bradley County, Tennessee that serves the city of Charleston.

Route description

SR 308 begins at a bearing intersection with SR 306 (Eureka Road, Lower River Road) in northwestern Bradley County. SR 306 continues south to the community of Hopewell northwest of Cleveland, and turns northwest to Meigs County and SR 58. The route continues north as Lower River Road, taking its name from its parallel of the Hiwassee River, and crosses the Chickamauga Lake impoundment where Candies Creek runs into the river. Approximately one mile later, the road turns sharp east, crossing Candies Creek Ridge a short distance later before coming to an intersection with Old Lower River Road, the former route of SR 308, almost two miles later. The route then turns sharp south and runs straight for another mile, before turning east once again, and coming to an interchange with I-75. The route then becomes known as Lauderdale Memorial Highway. The route continues for another mile, passing through the southern edge of an industrial area, and crosses South Mouse Creek, before entering farmland and passing Walker Valley High School. A short distance later, the road comes to a four-way intersection with Walker Valley Road, and begins its descent over a ridge. Approximately one mile later, it meets its eastern terminus in southern Charleston with US 11 (North Lee Highway/Hiwassee Street/SR 2).

History
The route originally continued to Charleston along the Hiwassee on what is now Old Lower River Road. This route is very curvy, and contains a one-lane bridge across Mouse Creek. For this reason, part of the highway was moved to its current location in the late 1960s and early 1970s when the interstate was built. The new section between I-75 and US 11 was named Lauderdale Memorial Highway in memory of a superintendent of the Bradley County Road Department who died months before its completion and had lobbied for its construction.  The northern edge of the industrial area traversed by SR 308 is located on this route, which includes such industries as Wacker Polysilicon and Olin Corporation.

Major intersections

References

308
Transportation in Bradley County, Tennessee